Holy Trinity Church is a heritage-listed Anglican church on the corner of Newcastle and Pool Streets, in York, Western Australia. The church was consecrated in 1858 by the first Anglican Bishop of Perth, Mathew Blagden Hale.

Earlier church 
The first Anglican church in York was built in 1840 by Peter Barrow, on his property in Avon Terrace and consecrated in 1848.  It was dedicated to St John.  Being made of mud brick and in disrepair, the first building was demolished. A replacement was built at the same site and dedicated in 1861.

New glebe lands were granted to the parish on the east side of the river in 1849 and a parsonage was built in 1852.

The Holy Trinity church, on the other side of the Avon River was constructed in 1854, and both churches were operating and maintained until 1905 when the second Saint Johns was moved to the Holy Trinity site and became the parish hall.

Construction 
The architect was Richard Roach Jewell. The church "was built in the style of the latter part of the 11th century", that is, in Norman style, or Victorian Romanesque.  The church was designed to have a "lofty spire" above the tower and to accommodate 250 people. 

The foundation stone for the church was laid on 25 October 1854 by Mrs Fitzgerald, the wife of the Governor, Captain Charles Fitzgerald.

Tenders were called between November 1854 and March 1855 for lime, brickwork, "roofing, weather-boarding and shingling", and doors and seats. Construction cost was 1,100 pounds. The tenders for lime were to be submitted to S A Barter of Guildford or John Henry Monger Snr of York.

A newspaper article commented that the (convict) workmen "have displayed great interest in their work and deserve much credit for their skill".

The church was opened on 26 October 1855.  When first constructed, it consisted of a nave and a small porch.

The church was consecrated in 1858.  

In 1893, the roof was raised, and the bell tower, chancel and vestries were added.

Interior 
The organ was built by Albert Pearse in London in 1898 and was shipped in parts to Australia to be installed in the church in the same year. the organ was restored in 1998.

The altar and bishop's chair were dedicated to the rector, Edward Williams, who was killed in a horse accident in 1899. 

The stained glass windows, installed in 1986, were designed by Robert Juniper.  The windows depict traditional religious scenes together with landscapes, flora and fauna and an intermingling of historical events from the Avon Valley.

First world war 
Community events commemorating the earlier versions of Anzac Day occurred at the church, 
and church events during the war continued.

1968 Meckering earthquake 

The 1968 Meckering earthquake seriously damaged the belltower and the height was reduced by about a third. The tower was subsequently rebuilt.

1979 cookbook 
The church community was involved in producing a cookbook in the late 1970s.

Holy Trinity Church Society 
In the 1980s and after, the Church Society had a range of talks and publications relating to Anglican Church history and notable figures in that history.
The church was also involved in theatrical events in the 1980s.

In the 2000s the church produced a community fixtures calendar.

Conservation 
In 1995 a conservation report was done on the buildings related to the church.

Heritage registration 
The church and related buildings were permanently added to the State Register of Heritage Places in 1996.
 Anglican Church Inventory, 31 July 1996
 York Municipal Inventory, 31 December 1995 		 		
 Classified by the National Trust, 5 March 1985 		
 Register of the National Estate, 22 March 1978

See also
 List of Anglican churches in Western Australia
 List of State Register of Heritage Places in the Shire of York

Notes

References

External links

York
York
Brick buildings and structures
Buildings and structures in York, Western Australia
Heritage places in York, Western Australia
State Register of Heritage Places in the Shire of York
Victorian architecture in Western Australia
Western Australian places listed on the defunct Register of the National Estate
19th-century Anglican church buildings
19th-century churches in Australia
1854 establishments in Australia
Churches completed in 1855